USS Allen was a row galley built in 1814 at Vergennes, Vermont, by Adam and Noah Brown. She was commissioned during the summer of 1814, with Sailing Master William M. Robins in command. She became a unit of Commodore Thomas Macdonough's squadron on Lake Champlain and participated in the Battle of Lake Champlain in September 1814, during which the American squadron captured the remnants of the British squadron under Captain George Downie. After the War of 1812, she remained in active service for another decade. She was sold at Whitehall, New York, sometime in late 1824 or early 1825.

References
 

1814 ships
Row galleys of the United States Navy
War of 1812 ships of the United States
Ships built in Vermont
1814 establishments in Vermont